Position often refers to:
 Position (geometry), the spatial location (rather than orientation) of an entity
 Position, a job or occupation

Position may also refer to:

Games and recreation
 Position (poker), location relative to the dealer
 Position (team sports), a player role within a team

Human body
 Human position, the spatial relation of the human body to itself and the environment
 Position (obstetrics), the orientation of a baby prior to birth
 Positions of the feet in ballet
 Position (music), the location of the hand on a musical instrument
 Proprioception, the sense of the relative position of neighbouring parts of the body
 Asana (yoga), the location and posture of the body while practicing yoga
 Sex position, the arrangement of bodies during sexual intercourse

Humanities, law, economics and politics
 Philosophical theory, a belief or set of beliefs about questions in philosophy
 Position (finance), commitments in a financial marketplace
 Social position, the position of an individual in a society and culture
 Political position within a political spectrum

Science and mathematics
 Position (vector), a mathematical identification of relative location
 Position in positional notation of mathematical operations

Other uses
 The Position, a novel by Meg Wolitzer
 Positions (book), a book by Jacques Derrida
 Positions (album), a 2020 album by Ariana Grande
 "Positions" (song), the album's title track
 The Positions, 2015 album by Gang of Youths

See also
 Location (disambiguation)
 Positioning (disambiguation)